Pablo Leguizamón Arce (born 5 October 1982 in Asunción, Paraguay) is a Paraguayan-born naturalized Argentine professional footballer. In 2013, Argentine newspaper Clarín named him a historic defender from Argentina's lower divisions.

Club career

Early career
His first steps in football were at Paraguayan club Sol de América.

San Telmo
He joined San Telmo in 2000. He was promoted to the first team in 2001 and spent 8 years with the club. In these eight years, Leguizamón Arce joined Nueva Chicago and Huracán on loan respectively.

Huracán (loan)
In Huracan's squad in 2006, Leguizamon teamed with Pablo Migliore, Leandro Grimi, Nicolas Sartori, Mauricio Jofre, Cristian Sanchez Prette, Martin Zapata, Walter Coyette, Esteban Vizcarra, Federico Poggi, Juan Sara, Joaquin Larrivey and Japanese player Yusuke Kato.

Between 2001 and 2008, Leguizamon amassed 136 league appearances for San Telmo in Argentina's B Nacional.

Villa Mitre
He left San Telmo and joined Villa Mitre de Bahía Blanca in 2008 but left the club and joined Colegiales in 2009.

Colegiales
After spending a season with Colegiales, he joined Atlético Tucumán on a free transfer in 2010, but rejoined Colegiales in 2011.

He appeared in 121 league games for Colegiales between 2009 and 2014.

Happy Valley
After spending 13 years in Argentina, Leguizamón Arce joined Hong Kong First Division League side Happy Valley in July 2013 and left in January 2014. Leguizamon incorporated to Happy Valley's team after its Argentine coach Sergio Timoner contacted him in March to play with the club. Leguizamon colleagued with Argentines Mauro Beltramella and Jonathan Acosta.

Gimnasia
In August 2016, Leguizamon joined Gimnasia upon request from Dario Alaniz.

Rangers
On 30 July 2019, Leguizamón Arce returned to Hong Kong and joined Hong Kong Premier League club Rangers.

References

External links
 Profile at BDFA 
 

1982 births
Living people
Paraguayan footballers
Paraguayan expatriate footballers
San Telmo footballers
Club Atlético Colegiales (Argentina) players
Club Atlético Huracán footballers
Villa Mitre footballers
Atlético Tucumán footballers
Nueva Chicago footballers
Expatriate footballers in Argentina
Hong Kong First Division League players
Expatriate footballers in Hong Kong
Happy Valley AA players
Hong Kong Premier League players
Hong Kong Rangers FC players
Association football defenders